The 2015 APRA Silver Scroll Awards was held on Thursday 17 September 2015 at Vector Arena in Auckland, celebrating excellence in New Zealand songwriting. The 2015 ceremony marked the 50th presentation of the Silver Scroll award. As well as honouring the best songwriting of 2015, the awards retrospectively awarded the best song of 1981 as previously no award was presented in that year.

Silver Scroll award 

The Silver Scroll award celebrates outstanding achievement in songwriting of original New Zealand pop music. The short list of finalists was announced on 20 September.

Long list 

In July 2015 a top 20 long list was announced. From this list APRA members voted to decide the five songs that make up the year's short list.

 Dave Rowlands/Stephen Heard/Andrew Moller (Clap Clap Riot + Buzz Moller) "Back In To Your Life"
 Nadia Reid (Nadia Reid) "Call The Days"
 Ruban Nielson/Jacob Portrait (Unknown Mortal Orchestra) "Can't Keep Checking My Phone"
 Thomas Stoneman/Josh Fountain (Thomston) "Collarbones"
 Anji Sami (She's So Rad) "Cool It"
 Marlon Williams/Tim Moore (Marlon Williams) "Dark Child"
 Joel Little/Jarryd James (Jarryd James) "Do You Remember"
 Mel Parsons (Mel Parsons) "Get Out Alive"
 Toni Randle Keegan (Eyreton Hall) "Just In Case Allelujah"
 Joel Little/Georgia Nott/Caleb Nott (Broods) "L.A.F."

 Sean Donnelly (SJD) "Little Pieces"
 Ruban Nielson/Kody Nielson (Unknown Mortal Orchestra) "Multi-Love"
 Martin Andrews (Martin Andrews) "Naomi"
 Jolyon Mulholland (Mulholland) "Perfect Health"
 Marlon Gerbes/Matiu Walters/Priese Board (Six60) "Special"
 Evan Sinton/Jaden Parkes/Josh Fountain (Maala) "Touch"
 Sean Donnelly (SJD) "Unplugged"
 Anthonie Tonnon (Anthonie Tonnon) "Water Underground"
 Bill Urale/James Britt (King Kapisi) "Welcome Back"
 Ella Yelich-O'Connor/ Joel Little (Lorde) "Yellow Flicker Beat"

Silver Scroll 1981 

The Silver Scroll award was not awarded in 1981, so APRA retrospectively presented the award as part of the 2015 ceremony. In July 2015 a short list of five songs from the 1981 eligibility period was announced.

New Zealand Music Hall of Fame 

Steel guitar player Bill Sevesi was inducted into the New Zealand Music Hall of Fame as APRA New Zealand's 2015 inductee.

Other awards 

Six other awards were presented at the Silver Scroll Awards: APRA Maioha Award (for excellence in contemporary Maori music),  SOUNZ Contemporary Award (for creativity and inspiration in composition), two awards acknowledging songs with the most radio and television play in New Zealand and overseas, and APRA Best Original Music in a Feature Film Award and APRA Best Original Music in a Series Award.

APRA song awards 

Outside of the Silver Scroll Awards, APRA presented five genre awards in 2015. The APRA Best Pacific Song was presented at the Pacific Music Awards, the APRA Best Country Music Song was presented at the New Zealand Country Music Awards, the APRA Best Māori Songwriter was presented at the Waiata Maori Music Awards and the APRA Children's Song of the Year and What Now Video of the Year were presented live on What Now.

References

External links 
 APRA AMCOS Silver Scroll Awards 

New Zealand music awards
2015 in New Zealand music
2015 music awards